Risto Vidaković (Serbian Cyrillic: Pиcтo Bидaкoвић; born 5 January 1969) is a Bosnian professional football manager and former player who is currently managing Singapore Premier League club Lion City Sailors.

He spent his playing career as a centre-back for Yugoslav clubs Sarajevo and Red Star Belgrade before moving to Spain, where he spent five seasons with Real Betis in La Liga, and a season each for Osasuna and Poli Ejido. Internationally, he represented Yugoslavia and FR Yugoslavia.

After retiring as a player, Vidaković became an assistant coach for the Serbia national team and Segunda División side Murcia. He was then head coach for Segunda División B clubs Écija, Cádiz, and the Real Betis reserve team. With Filipino club Ceres–Negros, he won three consecutive Philippines Football League titles. He also won a Dhivehi Premier League title with Maziya.

Club career

Risto Vidaković was born in Šekovići, SR Bosnia and Herzegovina, which was then a republic within SFR Yugoslavia. He started his career at FK Sarajevo, and played in the last edition of the Yugoslav First League, appearing in 13 games as the Bosnian team finished in ninth position. Subsequently, he signed for national giants Red Star Belgrade, and competed in the inaugural season of the Serbian-Montenegrin tournament, scoring a career-best 12 goals in his second year but eventually leaving the capital side without any silverware won.

In 1994, Vidaković joined Real Betis in Spain, which had just returned from the second division. In his first year in La Liga he appeared in 30 matches and netted twice as the Andalusians overachieved a third-place finish. He rarely missed a game in his first three seasons.

Also at Betis, Vidaković suffered a serious injury from which he never fully recovered, leaving the club in 2000 after its top flight relegation. He joined another team in the country, CA Osasuna, which had moved in the opposite direction, then saw out his career at 33 after playing one year with Polideportivo Ejido.

International career
Vidaković played once for Yugoslavia, appearing in a 1–3 friendly loss with Brazil on 30 October 1991. He then contributed with five matches as FR Yugoslavia qualified for the first time ever to an international tournament, the 1998 FIFA World Cup in France, but was eventually omitted from the final squad. His final international was a January 1998 friendly match against Tunisia.

Managerial career
Vidaković  began his coaching career as an assistant to Javier Clemente, his former coach at Betis, who was appointed head coach of the Serbia national team in July 2006. When Clemente became coach of Real Murcia in March 2008, Vidaković was again his assistant. In the following years, Vidaković returned to Andalusia and started his head coach career with third-tier teams Écija Balompié, Cádiz and Real Betis B. In 2013, he coached Honduran club Motagua.

Ceres (2016–2020)
On 5 July 2016, Vidaković  was appointed head coach of Filipino club Ceres for the second round of the 2016 United Football League (UFL), replacing Ali Go. His first match in charge was a 2–1 loss to Green Archers United on 7 August. His first win as Ceres' coach was an 11–0 thrashing of Forza on 14 September. In their penultimate match of the season, they defeated their title rivals Global 5–0. However, Global were still ahead by six points and Ceres finished the season as runners-up.

In 2016, Ceres were also participating in the Singapore Cup. At the time of Vidaković's appointment, the team had made it to the semi-finals. In the 80th minute of the first leg, Vidaković was sent off after continually complaining to the officials. Suspended from the second leg, technical director Ali Go filled in for him as Ceres were eliminated by Tampines Rovers on 5–3 aggregate.

In the 2017 pre-season, Vidaković recruited Spanish defender Súper, who played under him at Betis B. In the 2017 AFC Cup, Ceres topped their group by beating S.League runners-up Tampines Rovers and Vietnamese champions Hà Nội. They then went on to defeat Malaysian champions Johor Darul Ta'zim in the ASEAN Zonal Semifinal, and Singapore's Home United in the zonal final, thus winning the ASEAN Zone. In the Inter-zone play-off semi-finals, they faced Tajikistan's Istiklol, winners of the Central Asia Zone. Losing on 5–1 aggregate, this was the furthest the club has reached in the AFC Cup.  

In the Philippines Football League (PFL), which replaced the UFL, Ceres faced Kaya on 6 May for the new league's first ever match which ended in a 1–1 draw. Before kickoff in an away match against Global Cebu on 5 July, Vidaković complained about the uneven pitch. He was later sent off in the 56th minute after expressing his frustrations at the match officials. Ceres lost the match 1–0. On 14 October, in another match against Kaya, Vidaković was sent off after arguing with the officials for what he believed was an uncalled foul that led to a Kaya goal. The match ended in a 3–2 win for Ceres. Their 24 November match against league leaders Meralco Manila ended in a goalless draw, thus failing to overcome their one-point deficit. In their final match of the regular season, they were defeated by Global Cebu 2–0, sealing their second-seed finish with 57 points from 17 wins, 6 draws, and 5 losses. In the post-season playoffs, they defeated Kaya in the semifinals before beating Global 4–1 in the final, winning the league's inaugural title.

In the 2018 pre-season, after first-choice goalkeeper Roland Müller went on leave, Vidaković recruited former Betis goalkeeper Toni Doblas. As the previous season's league champions, Ceres were set to play in the AFC Champions League qualifying play-offs for the first time in their history. After beating Burmese champions Shan United on penalties, Vidaković's side managed an upset away win against Australia's Brisbane Roar. However, they failed to progress to the group stage after falling to China's Tianjin Quanjian in the final play-off round. Relegated to the AFC Cup, Ceres thrashed Cambodian champions Boeung Ket 9–0 in their opening group match—one of the largest margins of victory in AFC Cup history. In a rematch of the previous season's ASEAN zonal final, Ceres lost to Home United 3–1 on aggregate.

In the PFL, Ceres–Negros started their season with a five-match winning streak, which was ended by a 2–0 home loss to Kaya on 12 May. On 12 August, during a home match against Davao Aguilas, he was sent off after confronting the referee for what he saw as an uncalled foul on goalkeeper Toni Doblas by Davao's James Younghusband. Ceres lost the match 3–0. Vidaković's Ceres side ended the season with 19 wins, 3 draws, and 3 losses—successfully defending their league title. Unlike the previous season, the 2018 PFL was a pure round-robin tournament.

He later led the club in the Philippines Football League until 2020.

Maziya (2021)
On 3 January 2021, Vidaković was announced as the new manager of Maldivian club Maziya in the Dhivehi Premier League. He won his first match with the club on 10 January, beating Super United Sports 3–0. Maziya won the 2020–21 league title without a single loss.

Managerial statistics

Honours

Player
Red Star Belgrade
FR Yugoslavia Cup: 1992–93

Manager
Ceres–Negros
Philippines Football League: 2017, 2018, 2019

Maziya
Dhivehi Premier League: 2020–21

References

External links

Betisweb stats and bio 
National team data 

1969 births
Living people
People from Šekovići
Serbs of Bosnia and Herzegovina
Association football defenders
Yugoslav footballers
Yugoslavia international footballers
Serbia and Montenegro footballers
Serbia and Montenegro international footballers
Bosnia and Herzegovina footballers
FK Sarajevo players
Red Star Belgrade footballers
Real Betis players
CA Osasuna players
Polideportivo Ejido footballers
Yugoslav First League players
La Liga players
Segunda División players
Serbia and Montenegro expatriate footballers
Bosnia and Herzegovina expatriate footballers
Expatriate footballers in Spain
Serbia and Montenegro expatriate sportspeople in Spain
Bosnia and Herzegovina expatriate sportspeople in Spain
Bosnia and Herzegovina football managers
Serbian football managers
Écija Balompié managers
Cádiz CF managers
F.C. Motagua managers
Ceres–Negros F.C. managers
Segunda División B managers
Philippines Football League head coaches
United Football League (Philippines) head coaches
Bosnia and Herzegovina expatriate football managers
Serbian expatriate football managers
Expatriate football managers in Spain
Serbian expatriate sportspeople in Spain
Expatriate football managers in Honduras
Serbian expatriate sportspeople in Honduras
Expatriate football managers in the Philippines
Serbian expatriate sportspeople in the Philippines
Expatriate football managers in the Maldives
Serbian expatriate sportspeople in the Maldives